Girnar is an ancient hill in Junagadh, Gujarat, India.

Geology
Mount Girnar is a major igneous plutonic complex which intruded into the basalts towards the close of the Deccan Trap period. The rock types identified in this complex are gabbros (tholeiitic and alkalic), diorites, lamprophyres, alkali-syenites and rhyolites. The parent gabbroic magma is shown to have given rise in sequence to diorites, lamprophyres and alkali-syenites. The rhyolite, though earlier considered a product of differentiation, is now believed to be an independent magma without any genetic link with the gabbro and its variants.

History

Fourteen of Ashoka's Major Rock Edicts, dating to circa 250 BCE, are inscribed on a large boulder that is housed in a small building located outside the town of Junagadh on Saurashtra peninsula in the state of Gujarat, India. It is located on Girnar Taleti road, at about 2 km (1.2 mi) far from Uperkot Fort easterly, some 2 km before Girnar Taleti. An uneven rock, with a circumference of seven meters and a height of ten meters, bears inscriptions etched with an iron pen in Brahmi script in a language similar to Pali and date back to 250 BCE, thus marking the beginning of written history of Junagadh.

On the same rock there are inscriptions in Sanskrit added around 150 CE by Mahakshatrap Rudradaman I, the Saka (Scythian) ruler of Malwa, a member of the Western Satraps dynasty (see Junagadh rock inscription of Rudradaman). The edict also narrates the story of Sudarshan Lake which was built or renovated by Rudradaman I, and the heavy rain and storm due to which it had broken.

Another inscription dates from about 450 CE and refers to Skandagupta, the last Gupta Empire.

The protective building around the edicts was built in 1900 by Nawab Rasool Khan of Junagadh State at a cost of Rs 8,662. It was repaired and restored in 1939 and 1941 by the rulers of Junagadh. The wall of the structure had collapsed in 2014.

A much smaller replica of these Girnar edicts has been positioned outside the entrance of the National Museum in Delhi.

Similarly, inside the Parliament Museum at New Delhi, an exhibit replicates the act of artists sculpting inscriptions of Girnar edict on a rock.

Girnar Ropeway 

Girnar ropeway is Asia's longest ropeway. First proposed in 1983, the construction started only in September 2018 due to government approval delays and litigation. The construction and operation is managed by Usha Breco Limited. The project was inaugurated on 24 October 2020 by now Prime Minister Narendra Modi.  The ropeway is 2,320 metres (7,600 ft) long, takes passengers 850 metres (2,800 ft) above the hill to the Ambika temple within 10 minutes of ropeway ride.

Jain Temples

Tanks 
Outside to the north of the Kumarapala's temple, there is the Bhima Kunda, a tank measuring 70 feet by 50 feet. Below it and on the verge of the cliff is a smaller tank of water and near it a small canopy supported by three roughly hewn pillars and a piece of rock containing a short octagonal stone called Hathi pagla or Gajapada, the elephant foot, a stratum on the top of which is of light granite and the rest of dark the lower part is immersed in water most of the year.

As per historical records, Sajjana, the minister of Chaulukya king Siddharaja Jayasimha, built the Neminatha temple using the state treasury. When he collected the funds to return as a compensation, the king declined to accept it so the funds were used to built the temple.

Sahastraphana (thousand hooded) Parshwanatha, the image which was consecrated in 1803 CE (VS 1459) by Vijayajinendra Suri, is currently the central deity in the temple. The temple originally housed the golden image of Mahavira and brass images of Shantinatha and Parshwanatha on its sides.

The east facing temple has 52 small shrines surrounding the central temple. It has an open portico with ceilings with fine carvings. In the bhamti or cloisters surrounding the court, there are also some remarkable designs in carved ceilings. The roof of the rangamandapa has fine carvings. The shrine proper must have been removed and replaced with new one at the end of the sixteenth century or the start of the seventeenth century. It is known that Karmachandra Bachchhavat, minister of the king of Bikaner, had sent a funds to renovate temple in Shatrunjaya and Girnar under Jinachandrasuri IV of Kharatara Gaccha during the reign of Akbar. There is a shrine housing replica of Ashtapada hill in the south, shrine with Shatrunjayavatar in west, behind the main temple, and Samet Shikhar (or Nandishwar Dwipa) in north.

Girnar's Initial trek
The base of the mountain, known as Girnar Taleti, is about 4 km east of the center of Junagadh. There are temples and other sacred places all along this stretch.

The traveller, in order to reach Girnar Taleti from Junagadh city, will pass through the Wagheshwari or Vagheshwari Gate (Girnar Darwaza), which is close to the Uparkot fort area, Easterly.

At about 200 metres from the gate, to the right of the road, is the Temple of Wagheshwari (Upale Vagheshwari maa), which is joined to the road by a causeway about 150 yards long. An ancient Verai Mata mandir and a modern Gayatri Shakti Peeth mandir are nearby.

About a furlong beyond this is a stone bridge, and just beyond it on the right are the Ashoka's Major Rock Edicts. The edicts are inscribed high up on a large, domed mass of black granite measuring roughly 20 feet x 30 feet. The inscription is in Brahmi script. They primarily are written in praise of 22nd Tirthankar Lord Neminath and how he attained salvation from the 5th and highest peak of the holy mountain. They confirm the presence of a pure and sacred Jain site along with the sacred footprints of Lord Neminath on the 5th peak / Ujjayanta. On the same rock can be found an inscription of the Western Satrap ruler Rudradaman, the Junagadh rock inscription of Rudradaman.

On leaving Ashoka's edicts, the route crosses the handsome bridge over the Sona-rekha, which here forms a fine sheet of water over golden sand, then passes a number of temples, at first on the left bank of the river and then on the right, to the largest of the temples. This is dedicated to Damodar, a name of Krishna, from Dam, a rope, because by tradition his mother in vain attempted to confine him with a rope when a child. The reservoir, Damodar Kund, at this place is accounted very sacred.

Next is an old shrine of Bhavnath, a form of Shiva, close to Girnar Taleti; Mrigi kund and Sudharshan lake are nearby.

Most persons who are not active climbers will probably proceed up the mountain in a swing doli from Taleti. A long ridge runs up from the west, and culminates in a rugged scarped rock, on the top of which are the temples. Close to the old shrine is a well called the Chadani vav.

The paved way begins just beyond this and continues for two-thirds of the ascent. The first resthouse, Chadia Parab, is reached, 480 feet, above the plain; and the second halting-place at Dholi-deri, 1000 feet above the plain. From here the ascent becomes more difficult, winding under the face of the precipice to the third resthouse, 1400 feet up. The path turns to the right along the edge of a precipice, which is very narrow, so that the doli almost grazes the scarp, which rises perpendicularly 200 feet above the traveller. On the right is seen the lofty mountain of Datar, covered with low jungle. At about 1500 feet there is a stone dharmsala, and from this there is a fine view of the rock called the Bhairav-Thampa, "the terrific leap," because devotees used to cast themselves from its top, falling 1000 feet or more.

At 2370 feet above Junagadh the gate of the enclosure known as the Deva Kota, or Ra Khengar's Palace, is reached.

Ambika Temple

South of this, is the Gaumukhi Shrine, near a plentiful spring of water.

From it the crest of the mountain (3330 feet) is reached by a steep flight of stairs. Here is an ancient temple of Hindu Goddess Amba mata temple, which is much resorted to by newly married couples . The bride and bridegroom have their clothes tied together, and attended by their male and female relations, adore the goddess and present cocoa-nuts and other offerings. This pilgrimage is supposed to procure for the couple along continuance of wedded bliss.

Festivals
The main event for Hindus is the Maha Shivaratri fair held every year on the 14th day of the Hindu calendar month of Magha. At least 1 million pilgrims visit the fair to participate in pooja and parikrama of Girnar hill. The procession begins at Bhavnath Mahadev Temple at Bhavnath. It then proceeds onwards to various akharas of various sects of sadhus, which are in Girnar hill from ancient times. The procession of sadhus and pilgrims ends again at Bhavnath temple after visiting Madhi, Malavela and Bara Devi temple. The fair begins with hoisting of fifty-two Gaja long flags at Bhavnath Mahadev temple. This fair is the backbone of the economy of Junagadh, as more than ten lakh pilgrims who visit the fair generate a revenue of 250 million in only five days.

See also
Radha Damodar Temple, Junagadh

References

Hindu pilgrimage sites in India
Hindu temples in Gujarat
Tourism in Gujarat
Hills of Gujarat
Highest points of Indian states and union territories
Jain pilgrimage sites
Tourist attractions in Junagadh district